Baron Pfyffer d'Altinhosen may refer to:
 Alphons Maximilian Pfyffer von Altishofen
 Hans Pfyffer